Senator Forney may refer to:

Alva Clark Forney (1871–1956), South Dakota State Senate
Daniel Munroe Forney (1784–1847), North Carolina State Senate